List of Gato-class submarines and their dispositions. 77 of these boats were built during World War II, commissioned from November 1941 through April 1944. The class was very successful in sinking Japanese merchant ships and naval vessels: the top three US submarines in tonnage sunk were Gatos, along with three of the top seven in number of ships sunk. But success had a price: 20 of the 52 US submarines lost in that war were of this class, plus , a damaged boat that returned to the US but was considered a constructive total loss and not repaired. Although many of the class were in reserve postwar and scrapped in 1959-1960, some Gatos served actively with the US Navy into the late 1960s, and others served with foreign navies into the early 1970s.

SS-361 through SS-364 were initially ordered as Balao-class, and were assigned hull numbers that fall in the middle of the range of numbers for the Balao class (SS-285 through SS-416 & SS-425–426). Thus, in some references they are listed with that class. However, they were completed by Manitowoc as Gatos, due to an unavoidable delay in Electric Boat's development of Balao-class drawings. Manitowoc was a follow yard to Electric Boat, and was dependent on them for designs and drawings.

Abbreviations
Abbreviations and hull classification symbols for postwar redesignations/conversions:
 AGSS — auxiliary submarine (various roles including sonar testing)
 APSS/LPSS — amphibious transport submarine
 FS — "fleet snorkel" conversion, including a snorkel and streamlined sail
 G IB — GUPPY IB conversion, including a snorkel, streamlined sail, and improved batteries
 IXSS — unclassified submarine
 PT — pierside trainer for naval reservists, reportedly immobilized by removing the propellers
 SSG — guided missile submarine
 SSK — hunter-killer submarine
 SSO/AOSS — submarine oiler conversion
 SSR — radar picket submarine
 Struck — Struck (deleted) from the Naval Vessel Register, usually followed by scrapping or other final disposal

Ships in class

See also
 List of most successful American submarines in World War II
 List of lost United States submarines
 List of Balao-class submarines
 List of Tench-class submarines

References

External links 

 Description of GUPPY conversions at RNSubs.co.uk
 GUPPY and other diesel boat conversions page (partial archive)
 Navsource.org fleet submarines photo index page

 
Gato
Gato